Mirage is the name of two fictional characters appearing in American comic books published by DC Comics. The first was a minor villain of Batman. The second is a heroine affiliated with the Teen Titans.

Fictional character biography

Mike
The first Mirage was a man named Mike (also referred to as "Kerry Austin") and appeared in Detective Comics #511 (February 1982). He uses a gem that causes people to see elaborate illusions. He commits crimes while his victims are occupied fighting against these illusions. This crime wave brings him to the attention of Batman. Batman faces Mirage several times before coming up with a strategy to beat him. During the encounter, Mirage's gem is destroyed. Batman is able to defeat him and send him to jail.

Mirage was revealed to have been a graduate of the Academy of Crime.

While in jail, Mirage manages to create contact lenses from fragments of his jewel. He proceeds to create the illusion of himself in jail and escapes to the circus he once worked for. Starting another crime wave, Batman is once again alerted to his actions. This time, Batman easily beats him and sends him back to prison. Mirage also fought Manhunter once using his illusions so successfully, he nearly killed the bounty hunter.

Following the Infinite Crisis, Mirage is freed from prison again. He is killed in 52 #25 (2006) by Bruno Mannheim. Mannheim bashes Mirage's head into the "Crime Bible" and sends his body to the kitchen to be prepared for Mannheim to eat, revealing Mannheim is a cannibal.

Miriam Delgado

Mirage was originally one of the Teen Titans who came from the future to kill Donna Troy before she could give birth to her son, who, in Mirage's future, became the evil dictator Lord Chaos.

After Donna sacrificed her powers to prevent that future from becoming real, Mirage and the other Team Titans relocated to Donna's farm in New Jersey. She had to deal with Killowat's intense crush on her and the more malicious intents of another man. Mirage was raped by her former lover Deathwing and became pregnant with his child. For a while she deceived her friends, using her powers to make it seem as if she had lost the child.

Mirage is part of the honor guard that escorts Superman's body to his tomb.

During the Zero Hour, she found out she wasn't from an alternate timeline, but from this one. She was, in fact, a runaway street urchin from Brazil, whom the Time Trapper had kidnapped and implanted with false memories. Mirage remained a member of Arsenal's Titans team. During this time, her powers fluctuated. She experienced uncontrolled illusions. She found she could project an image to a spot where she was not and remain hidden all the same.

Eventually, she gave birth to a daughter named Julienne and left the Titans to spend time with her.

She helps the Titans to save former Titan Cyborg in the Technis Imperative storyline. During a confrontation with the Justice League during this incident, she tricks the Martian Manhunter with an image of his dead wife and is violently subdued. She reappears again, alongside other former Titans, to help the new incarnation of the Titans defeat Dr. Light in the 3-part Lights Out storyline.

Mirage was one of the Titans that battled Superboy-Prime near Smallville, Kansas in Infinite Crisis #4 and Teen Titans (vol. 3) #32. She also rejoined the Titans for a brief period during the "one year gap".

In Teen Titans (vol. 3) #99, she was one of the former Titans that came to aid the Teen Titans in the battle between Superboy-Prime.

Powers and abilities
Mike can create believable illusions in the minds of the people around him by using a gem of unknown origin. The gem projects both optical and audio stimuli.

Miriam Delgado can also create illusions and use them to disguise her appearance.

Other versions
Lord Chaos' rise to power soon resulted in Earth becoming a mobile battle platform. Miri became captain of a resistance ship, which Chaos took.

In other media

Television
A character similar to Mirage named Miranda appears in Static Shock, voiced by Gavin Turek. She and her brother Bryon gained powers from the Big Bang, with her being able to create illusions and Bryon able to create powerful sound waves. Bryon, now known as Boom, forced her into a life of theft. When Mirage began to question her brother's actions, he would always use their aging grandmother as justification. After Static saved her life, Miranda explained that her brother was different and needed help. However, she eventually realized that he had gone insane after breaking a promise that no one would get hurt during their final heist. Finally fed up with what her brother had become, she turned on him and helped Static defeat him. As she was taken by child services, she agreed to help Static fool his sister to protect his secret identity.

Miscellaneous
Teen Titans Go! #48 features a version of Mirage (who resembles Raven) as a member of the Teen Titans in another reality.

See also
 List of Batman family enemies

References

External links
DCU Guide: Mirage (Mike)
DCU Guide: Mirage (Miriam Delgado)

Articles about multiple fictional characters
DC Comics metahumans
Comics characters introduced in 1982
Comics characters introduced in 1991
DC Comics female superheroes
DC Comics female supervillains
Characters created by Gerry Conway
Characters created by Marv Wolfman
Fictional Brazilian people
Fictional illusionists
Fictional victims of sexual assault